The Kentucky Court of Appeals is the lower of Kentucky's two appellate courts, under the Kentucky Supreme Court.  Prior to a 1975 amendment to the Kentucky Constitution the Kentucky Court of Appeals was the only appellate court in Kentucky.  

The Court of Appeals has 14 members.  Two members are elected from each of seven districts and serve eight-year terms of office.  The Kentucky Court of Appeals judges are elected from districts that mirror the seven districts which elect the seven justices of the Supreme Court of Kentucky.  The 14 judges select one colleague to serve as chief judge for a four-year term.  The chief judge assigns judges and cases to panels. The current chief judge is Denise G. Clayton. The court usually sits in three judge panels.  Membership of the panels rotate so that all judges sit on at least one panel with each of their colleagues in any given year.  Usually one judge is chosen to author the majority opinion for each panel in a particular case.

The Kentucky Court of Appeals has a headquarters building and courtroom in Frankfort, the state capital, but unlike the Kentucky Supreme Court, the three-judge panels of the Kentucky Court of Appeals frequently hear cases in courthouses all over Kentucky.

The Kentucky Court of Appeals hears appeals from the Kentucky Circuit Courts, with the exception of criminal cases involving sentences of death, life imprisonment, or imprisonment of twenty years or more, in which appeals are taken directly to the Kentucky Supreme Court. In addition, original actions may be filed with the Kentucky Court of Appeals in certain situations. Prior to the 1975 constitutional amendment the Clerk of the Court of Appeals was an elected position.  This elected position was abolished by the 1975 constitutional amendment.  Former governor Martha Layne Collins served as Clerk of the Court of Appeals before her election as Lieutenant Governor and Governor of Kentucky. Judges were elected on a partisan ballot until 1976;  a law now mandates nonpartisan judicial elections in Kentucky.

Judges 
:

See also
 Old Court-New Court controversy
 Courts of Kentucky

References

External links
 Kentucky Court of Appeals

Kentucky state courts
Kentucky law
State appellate courts of the United States
 
Courts and tribunals with year of establishment missing